This is a list of Ukrainian football transfers summer 2020. Only clubs in 2020–21 Ukrainian Premier League are included.

Ukrainian Premier League

Desna Chernihiv

In:

Out:

Dnipro-1

In:

Out:

Dynamo Kyiv

In:

Out:

Inhulets Petrove

In:

Out:

Kolos Kovalivka

In:

Out:

Lviv

In:

Out:

Mariupol

In:

Out:

Mynai

In:

Out:

Oleksandriya

In:

Out:

Olimpik Donetsk

In:

Out:

Rukh Lviv

In:

Out:

Shakhtar Donetsk

In:

Out:

Vorskla Poltava

In:

Out:

Zorya Luhansk

In:

Out:

Ukrainian Second League

Cherkashchyna 

In:

Out:

FC Chernihiv 

In:

 

Out:

Nyva Ternopil 

In:

Out:

FC Nyva Ternopil

References

Ukraine
Transfers
2020